Aleksandr Vladimirovich Dolgov (born 24 September 1998) is a Russian football player who plays as a centre-forward for FC Khimki.

Club career
He made his debut in the Russian Professional Football League for FC Kazanka Moscow on 11 August 2017 in a game against FC Kolomna.

He made his Russian Premier League debut for FC Rostov on 25 August 2019 in a game against FC Rubin Kazan, as a 90th-minute substitute for Aleksandr Saplinov.

On 16 October 2020 he was loaned to FC Khimki.

On 3 September 2021, he returned to FC Khimki on a permanent basis and signed a three-year contract with the club.

Honours

Individual
 Russian Professional Football League Zone West best player, best scorer (15 goals), best young player (2018–19).

Career statistics

References

External links
 
 

1998 births
Footballers from Voronezh
Living people
Russian footballers
Russia youth international footballers
Association football forwards
FC Lokomotiv Moscow players
FC Rostov players
FC Khimki players
Russian Premier League players
Russian Second League players